P-class submarine may refer to:

 , of the Royal Navy
 Porpoise-class submarine, of the Royal Navy
 , of the Soviet Navy
 Porpoise-class submarine, of the United States Navy